Ailinzebina onobiformis is a species of minute sea snail, a marine gastropod mollusk or micromollusk in the family Rissoinidae.

Description
The height of the shell attains 3.5 mm.

Distribution
This species occurs in the Atlantic Ocean on the coast of the Cape Verde islands.

References

 Rolán E., 2005. Malacological Fauna From The Cape Verde Archipelago. Part 1, Polyplacophora and Gastropoda

Rissoinidae
Gastropods described in 2000
Gastropods of Cape Verde